This is an alphabetical list of articles pertaining specifically to electrical and electronics engineering. For a thematic list, please see List of electrical engineering topics. For a broad overview of engineering, see List of engineering topics. For biographies, see List of engineers.

A
 866A –
 15 kV AC –
 2D computer graphics –
 3Com –
 Abrasion (mechanical) –
 AC adapter –
 AC power plugs and sockets –
 AC power –
 AC/AC converter –
 AC/DC receiver design –
 AC/DC conversion –
 Active rectification – 
 Actuator –
 Adaptive control –
 Adjustable-speed drive –
 Advanced Z-transform –
 Affinity law –
 Agbioeletric – 
 AIEE –
 All American Five – 
 Alloy –
 ALOHAnet –
 Alpha–beta transformation –
 Altair 8800 –
 Alternating current –
 Alternator (auto) –
 Alternator synchronization--
 Alternator –
 Altitude –
 Aluminium smelting –
 AIEE –
 Ammeter –
 Amorphous metal transformer – 
 Ampacity –
 Ampere –
 Ampère's circuital law –
 Ampère's force law –
 Ampère's law –
 Amplidyne –
 Amplifier –
 Amplitude modulation –
 Analog circuit –
 Analog filter –
 Analog signal processing –
 Analog signal –
 Analog-to-digital converter –
 Annealing (metallurgy) –
 Anode –
 Antenna (radio) –
 Apollo program –
 Apparent power –
 Apple Computer –
 Arc converter – 
 Arc furnace –
 Arc lamp –
 Arc welder –
 Argon –
 Arithmetic mean –
 Armature (electrical engineering) –
 Artificial heart –
 Artificial intelligence –
 Artificial neural networks –
 Artificial pacemaker –
 ASTM –
 Asymptotic stability –
 Asynchronous circuit –
 Audio and video connector –
 Audio equipment –
 Audio filter –
 Audio frequency –
 Audio noise reduction –
 Audio signal processing –
 Audion tube –
 Austin transformer – 
 Automatic gain control –
 Automatic transfer switch –
 Automation –
 Autorecloser –
 Autotransformer –
 Availability factor –
 Avalanche diode –
 Average rectified value –

B
 Backward-wave oscillator –
 Balanced line –
 Ball bearing motor –
 Balun – 
 Band-pass filter –
 Band-stop filter –
 Bandwidth (signal processing) –
 Bang–bang control –
 Barlow's wheel –
 Bartlett's bisection theorem –
 Base-load power plant –
 Battery (electricity) –
 Battery eliminator – 
 Bayer filter –
 Beam tetrode –
 Beat frequency –
 Beckman Instruments –
 Bell Telephone Laboratories –
 Biasing –
 BIBO stability –
 Bilinear transform –
 Bimetallic strip –
 Biofuel –
 Biomass –
 Biomedical engineering –
 Biot–Savart law –
 Bipolar junction transistor –
 Bipolar transistor –
 Black start –
 Blocked rotor test –
 Blu-ray Disc –
 Bode plot –
 Boolean algebra (logic) –
 Boolean algebra (structure) –
 Boost converter – 
 Booster (electric power) – 
 Bound charge –
 Braking chopper – 
 Branch circuit –
 Breakdown voltage –
 Bridge rectifier –
 Broadcasting –
 Brown, Boveri & Cie –
 Brush (electric) –
 Brushed DC electric motor –
 Brushless DC electric motor –
 Buchholz relay – 
 Buck converter –
 Buck–boost converter –
 Buck–boost transformer –
 Building codes –
 Bulb –
 Bunker Ramo Corporation –
 Busbar –
 Bushing (electrical) –
 Butterworth filter –
 Buzzer –

C
 Cable –
 Cadmium –
 Calculus –
 Canadian electrical code –
 Canadian Standards Association –
 Capacitance –
 Capacitor voltage transformer – 
 Capacitor –
 Capacitor-input filter – 
 Capacitors –
 Capacity factor –
 Carbon offset –
 Carrier current –
 Carrier wave –
 Category 3 cable –
 Category 5e cable –
 Category 5e –
 Category 6 cable –
 Catenary –
 Cathode ray oscilloscope –
 Cathode-ray tube –
 Cathode –
 Cat's-whisker detector –
 CATV –
 Cavity magnetron –
 magnetron –
 CCFL inverter – 
 CD –
 Cegelec –
 Cell energy –
 Center tap – 
 Ceramic resonator –
 Charactron –
 Charge pump – 
 Charge transfer switch – 
 Charge-coupled device –
 CHAYKA –
 Chebyshev filter –
 Chemistry –
 Choke (electronics) –
 Chopper (electronic) –
 Circle diagram –
 Circuit breaker panel –
 Circuit breaker –
 Circuit theory –
 Circuit Total Limitation (CTL) –
 Clamp meter –
 Clapp oscillator –
 Class of accuracy in electrical measurements –
 Closed-loop controller –
 Coal –
 Coax cable –
 Coaxial cable –
 Cochlear implant –
 Cockcroft–Walton generator –
 Cogeneration –
 Cold cathode –
 Cold work –
 Colossus (computer) –
 Combined cycle –
 Commercial off-the-shelf –
 Communication channel –
 Communication system –
 Communications satellite –
 Communications server –
 Commutation cell – 
 Commutator (electric) – 
 Compact fluorescent lamp –
 Compactron –
 Compensation winding – 
 Complex conjugate –
 Complex number – 
 Complex systems –
 Computational biology –
 Computational Intelligence –
 Computed tomography –
 Computer engineering –
 Computer hardware –
 Computer literacy –
 Computer programming –
 Computer science –
 Computer system –
 Computer –
 Computer-aided design –
 Computers –
 Concentric –
 Conduction band –
 Constant k filter –
 Constitutive equation –
 Consumer electronics –
 Contactor –
 Continuous Fourier transform –
 Continuous signal –
 Control engineering –
 Control systems –
 Control theory –
 Controllability –
 Controller (control theory) –
 Cooling tower –
 Copper cable certification –
 Copper loss – 
 Copper(I) oxide –
 Copper –
 Copper-clad aluminum –
 Copper-clad steel –
 Cornell University –
 Corona ring –
 Corrosion – 
 Coulomb –
 Coulomb's law –
 CPU –
 Creep (deformation) –
 Crest factor –
 Crossed-field amplifier –
 Crosstalk –
 Cruise control –
 Crystal oscillator –
 Ćuk converter – 
 Current (electricity) –
 Current density –
 Current division –
 Current source inverter –
 Current source –
 Current transformer –
 Current-to-voltage converter –
 Cybernetics –
 Cyber-physical system –
 Cycloconverter –
 Cylinder (geometry) –

D
 Damping ratio –
 Darlington transistor –
 Darmstadt University of Technology –
 Data compression –
 Data networks –
 DC injection braking – 
 DC-to-DC converter –
 Decision tree –
 Deformation (mechanics) – 
 Delay line (disambiguation) –
 Delco Electronics –
 Delta-wye transformer – 
 Demand factor –
 Demand response –
 Demodulation –
 Describing function –
 Design –
 Desktop computer –
 Detector (radio) –
 DIAC –
 Dielectric –
 Differential (mathematics) –
 Digital audio broadcasting –
 Digital circuit –
 Digital computers –
 Digital control –
 Digital Equipment Corporation –
 Digital filter –
 Digital image processing –
 Digital micromirror device –
 Digital protective relay –
 Digital signal controller –
 Digital signal processing –
 Digital television –
 Digital-to-analog converter –
 Diode bridge –
 Diode –
 Direct current –
 Direct on line starter--
 Direct torque control –
 Discrete cosine transform –
 Discrete Fourier transform –
 Discrete signal –
 Displacement current –
 Display device –
 Dissipation –
 Dissolved gas analysis – 
 Distributed control system –
 Distributed-element model –
 Distributed generation –
 Distribution board –
 Distribution transformer – 
 Dolby –
 Dot convention –
 Doubly fed electric machine –
 Downsampling –
 Dqo transformation –
 Droop speed control –
 Dual control theory –
 Dual loop –
 Ductility –
 DVD player –
 DVD –
 Dynamic braking –
 Dynamic demand (electric power) –
 Dynamic programming –
 Dynamic random-access memory –
 Dynamic system –
 Dynamo –

E
 Earth-leakage circuit breaker –
 Earth potential rise –
 Earth –
 Earthing system –
 Ebers-Moll –
 Ecotax –
 Eddy current –
 Edge detection –
 Edison effect –
 Edison Pioneer –
 Eigenvalues and eigenvectors – 
 Electret –
 Electric arc –
 Electric charge –
 Electric circuit –
 Electric current –
 Electric displacement field –
 Electric distribution systems –
 Electric field gradient –
 Electric field –
 Electric generator –
 Electric motor –
 Electric multiple unit –
 Electric potential –
 Electric power conversion –
 Electric power distribution –
 Electric Power Research Institute –
 Electric power transmission –
 Electric power –
 Electric shock –
 Electrical circuit –
 Electrical code –
 Electrical conductivity –
 Electrical conductor –
 Electrical contact –
 Electrical discharge machining (EDM) –
 Electrical element –
 Electrical engineering –
 Electrical equipment –
 Electrical generator –
 Electrical grid –
 Electrical impedance –
 Electrical insulation paper –
 Electrical insulation –
 Electrical load –
 Electrical machine –
 Electrical measurements –
 Electrical network –
 Electrical polarity –
 Electrical power transmission –
 Electrical resistance –
 Electrical steel –
 Electrical substation –
 Electrical Technologist –
 Electrical wiring in Hong Kong –
 Electrical wiring in North America –
 Electrical wiring in the United Kingdom –
 Electrical wiring regulations –
 Electrical wiring –
 Electricity distribution –
 Electricity generation –
 Electricity meter –
 Electricity pylon –
 Electricity –
 Electrification –
 Electroactive polymers –
 Electrocardiograph –
 Electrochemical engineering –
 Electrodes –
 Electro-diesel locomotive –
 Electrodynamics –
 Electrolytic –
 Electromagnet –
 Electromagnetic compatibility –
 Electromagnetic field –
 Electromagnetic induction –
 Electromagnetic radiation –
 Electromagnetic spectrum –
 Electromagnetic wave equation –
 Electromagnetism –
 Electromechanical –
 Electro-mechanical –
 Electromote –
 Electromotive force –
 Electron microscope –
 Electronic amplifier –
 Electronic circuit –
 Electronic component –
 Electronic Control Unit –
 Electronic design automation –
 Electronic engineering –
 Electronic filter –
 Electronic speed control –
 Electronics –
 Electrophorus –
 Electrostatic motor –
 Electrostatics –
 Embedded operating system –
 Embedded software –
 Embedded system –
 Enameled wire –
 Energy demand management –
 Energy economics –
 Energy efficient transformer –
 Energy returned on energy invested –
 Energy subsidies –
 Engineering economics –
 Engineering education –
 Engineering ethics –
 Engineering management –
 Engineering society –
 Engineering –
 Engine-generator –
 ENIAC –
 Environmental engineering –
 Epstein frame –
 Equalization (audio) –
 Equalization (communications) –
 Equivalent circuit –
 Equivalent impedance transforms –
 Error correction and detection –
 Error correction –
 Error detection –
 Ethernet –
 Ethical code –
 Euclidean geometry –
 Euler–Lagrange equation –
 Euler's formula –
 Euler's identity –
 Exponential stability –
 Extended Kalman filter – 
 External electric load –

F
 Fairchild Semiconductor –
 Farad –
 Faraday shield –
 Faraday–Lenz law –
 Faraday's law of induction –
 Fast Fourier transform –
 Fault (power engineering) –
 Fax –
 Feed forward (control) –
 Feedback amplifier –
 Feedback –
 Feed-in tariff –
 Ferranti –
 Ferrite core –
 Ferroelectricity –
 Fiber optic cable –
 Fiber optic –
 Field-effect transistor –
 Field-oriented control –
 Fields of engineering –
 Filter (signal processing) –
 Filter capacitor –
 Finite impulse response –
 Firmware –
 First principles –
 Fleming valve –
 Fleming's left-hand rule for motors –
 Flight instruments –
 Fluorescent lamp –
 Fluorinated ethylene propylene –
 Flux linkage –
 Flyback converter – 
 Flyback transformer –
 Fokker–Planck equation –
 Forward converter –
 Fossil-fuel phase-out--
 Fossil-fuel power station--
 Fourier series –
 Fourier transform –
 FPGA –
 Free-space optical communications –
 Frequency changer – 
 Frequency modulation –
 Frequency response –
 Frequency –
 Full load current –
 Full-wave rectifier –
 Fundamentals of Engineering exam –
 Fuse (electrical) –
 Fuzzy control –

G
 Gain scheduling –
 Galvanic corrosion –
 Galvanometer –
 Gas-filled tube –
 Gate turn-off thyristor (GTO) –
 Gauss's law –
 Gauss–Seidel method –
 General Electric Company plc –
 General Electric –
 General Radio Corporation –
 Generator (circuit theory) –
 Geographic information systems –
 Georgia School of Technology –
 Geoscience –
 Geothermal power –
 Germanium –
 Gigabit –
 Global Positioning System –
 Gold –
 Governor (device) –
 GPS –
 Gradient descent –
 Grid energy storage –
 Grid-tie inverter –
 Ground (electricity) –
 Ground and neutral –
 Ground-level power supply –
 Growler (electrical device) –
 GSM –
 Gunn diode –
 Gyrotron –

H
 H infinity –
 Hall-effect sensor –
 Harmonic distortion –
 Harmonic oscillator –
 Harmonic –
 Harmonics (electrical power) –
 H-bridge –
 HDTV –
 Headphone –
 Heat transfer –
 Heatsink –
 Heaviside step function –
 Henry (unit) –
 Hertz –
 Heterostructure –
 Hewlett-Packard –
 Hi-Fi –
 High-voltage cable –
 High voltage –
 High-pass filter –
 High-voltage direct current  –
 High-voltage switchgear –
 Hilbert transform  –
 History of electrical engineering –
 Holography –
 Home appliance –
 Homopolar generator –
 Homopolar motor –
 Horsepower –
 Hot wire barretter –
 Hradec substation  –
 Hughes Aircraft –
 Humidistat –
 HVAC –
 HVDC converter station –
 HVDC –
 Hybrid coil –
 Hybrid electric vehicle –
 Hybrid Synergy Drive –
 Hydroelectricity –
 Hydrogen embrittlement –
 Hydropower –
 Hydro-Québec's electricity transmission system –
 Hysteresis –

I
 Idaho National Laboratory –
 IEC61850 –
 IEEE Aerospace and Electronic Systems Society –
 IEEE Antennas and Propagation Society –
 IEEE Broadcast Technology Society –
 IEEE Circuits and Systems Society –
 IEEE Communications Society –
 IEEE Dielectrics & Electrical Insulation Society –
 IEEE Electromagnetic Compatibility Society –
 IEEE Electron Devices Society –
 IEEE Engineering in Medicine and Biology Society –
 IEEE Geoscience and Remote Sensing Society –
 IEEE Industrial Electronics Society –
 IEEE Industry Applications Society –
 IEEE Information Theory Society –
 IEEE Instrumentation & Measurement Society –
 IEEE Intelligent Transportation Systems Society –
 IEEE Magnetics Society –
 IEEE Microwave Theory and Techniques Society –
 IEEE Nuclear and Plasma Sciences Society –
 IEEE Oceanic Engineering Society –
 IEEE Photonics Society –
 IEEE Power & Energy Society –
 IEEE Reliability Society –
 IEEE Robotics and Automation Society –
 IEEE Signal Processing Society –
 IEEE Society on Social Implications of Technology –
 IEEE Solid-State Circuits Society –
 IEEE Systems, Man, and Cybernetics Society –
 IEEE Ultrasonics, Ferroelectrics, and Frequency Control Society –
 IEEE Vehicular Technology Society –
 IEEE Xplore –
 IGBT –
 Image impedance –
 Image noise reduction –
 Image processing –
 Impulse response –
 Incandescent lamp –
 Incandescent light bulb –
 Inchworm motor—
 Inductance –
 Induction coil – 
 induction cooker –
 Induction generator –
 Induction motor –
 Induction regulator – 
 Inductive coupling –
 Inductive output tube –
 Inductor –
 Inductors –
 Industrial and multiphase power plugs and sockets –
 Industrial automation –
 Industrial Control Systems –
 Infinite impulse response –
 Information appliance –
 Information communication technology –
 Information Theory –
 Information –
 Inga–Shaba  –
 Input/output –
 Inrush current –
 Institute of Electrical and Electronics Engineers (IEEE) –
 Institution of Electrical Engineers –
 Institution of Engineering and Technology –
 Instrumentation engineering –
 Instrumentation –
 Insulation monitoring device –
 Insulator (electrical) –
 Integrated circuit –
 Intel 4004 –
 Intel 8080 –
 Intel Corporation –
 Intel –
 Intelligent control –
 Intelligent Transportation System –
 Intermittent energy source –
 Internal combustion engine –
 International Electrotechnical Commission (IEC) –
 International Organization for Standardization –
 Interrupter –
 Invention of radio –
 Inverter (electrical) –
 Iron loss – 
 Isolated-phase bus –
 Isolation transformer –
 Iterative learning control –

J
 j operator –  
 Jacobi method –
 Jedlik's dynamo –
 JFET –
 Joule heating –
 Joule –

K
 Kalman filter –
 Kalman–Yakubovich–Popov lemma –
 Kelvin–Stokes theorem –
 Kilovolt-ampere –
 Kirchhoff's circuit laws –
 Klystron –
 Kolmogorov backward equation –

L
 Lacquer –
 LAN –
 Laplace transform –
 Laser diode –
 Leakage inductance – 
 Least squares –
 Light-emitting diode –
 Line integral –
 Linear alternator –
 linear differential equation –
 Linear matrix inequality –
 Linear motor –
 Linear transformation in rotating electrical machines –
 Linear variable differential transformer –
 linear –
 Lineman (occupation) –
 List of calculus topics –
 List of chemistry topics –
 List of railway electrification systems –
 List of electrical engineering topics –
 List of electrical engineers –
 List of electronics topics –
 List of mathematical topics –
 List of people in systems and control –
 List of physics topics –
 List of Russian electrical engineers –
 Litz wire –
 Load flow study –
 Load following power plant –
 Load-loss factor –
 Load management –
 Load profile –
 Local positioning system –
 LORAN –
 Lorentz force law –
 Loss power –
 Lossless data compression –
 Lossy data compression –
 Loudspeaker –
 Low-pass filter –
 LTI system theory –
 Lumen (unit) –
 Lumped parameters –
 Lyapunov stability –
 Lynch motor –

M
 Macroscopic –
 Machine learning --
 Magnet wire – 
 Magnet –
 Magnetic blowout –
 Magnetic circuit –
 Magnetic constant –
 Magnetic core –
 Magnetic-core memory –
 Magnetic field –
 Magnetic flux density –
 Magnetic flux –
 Magnetic moment –
 Magnetics –
 Magnetism –
 Magnetization –
 Magnetization current –
 Magnetostatics –
 Magnetostriction –
 Magnifying transmitter – 
 Main distribution frame –
 Mainframe computer –
 Mains electricity –
 Mains hum –
 Mains power systems –
 Manitoba Hydro –
 Manufacturing engineering –
 Marginal stability –
 Marine energy –
 Marx generator – 
 Maser –
 Massachusetts Institute of Technology –
 Mathematical model –
 Mathematics –
 Matrix (mathematics) –
 Maximum prospective short-circuit current –
 Maxwell equations –
 Maxwell's equations –
 Mead and Conway revolution –
 Mean free path –
 Measurement –
 Mechanical rectifier –
 Mechatronics –
 Medical equipment –
 Memistor –
 Mendocino motor –
 Mercury-arc rectifier –
 Mercury-arc valve –
 Mercury-vapor lamp –
 Mesh analysis – 
 Mesh networking –
 Mesh –
 Metadyne – 
 Metal detector –
 Metal rectifier –
 Metalworking –
 Micro combined heat and power –
 Microcontroller –
 Microelectromechanical systems –
 Microelectronics –
 Microfabrication –
 Microgeneration –
 Microphone –
 Microprocessor –
 Microprocessors –
 Microwave oven –
 Microwave radio –
 Microwave –
 Millman's theorem –
 Mineral-insulated copper-clad cable –
 Mobile phone –
 Modbus –
 Model predictive control –
 Modem –
 Modulation transformer –
 Modulation –
 Monoscope –
 Moon landing –
 Moore's law –
 Morse code –
 MOSFET –
 Motion control –
 Motor controller –
 Motor soft starter –
 Mp3 –
 MRI –
 Multics –
 Multimeter –
 Multisim –

N
 Nameplate capacity –
 Nanoengineering –
 Nanoinverter –
 Nanomotor –
 Nanotechnology –
 National electric code –
 National Electrical Manufacturers Association (NEMA) –
 Natural gas –
 Negative feedback –
 Negative resistance –
 Negawatt power –
 Nelson River Bipole –
 Neodymium magnets –
 Neon sign –
 Neon-sign transformer –
 Net metering –
 Network analyzer (AC power)--
 Network cable –
 Network protector –
 Neural networks –
 Newcastle-upon-Tyne Electric Supply Company –
 Niagara Falls –
 Nodal analysis –
 Node (circuits) –
 Noise cancelling –
 Noise reduction –
 Nominal impedance –
 Nonlinear control –
 Nonode –
 Norton theorem –
 Norton's theorem –
 Notch filter –
 NTSC –
 Nuclear power –
 Numerical control –
 Nuvistor –
 Nyquist frequency –
 Nyquist stability criterion –
 Nyquist–Shannon sampling theorem –

O
 Observability –
 Occupations in electrical/electronics engineering –
 Ohm –
 Ohmmeter –
 Ohm's law –
 Oil shale –
 One-line diagram  –
 On-premises wiring –
 Open-circuit test – 
 Open-circuit voltage –
 Open-circuit time constant method –
 Open-circuit voltage –
 Operational amplifier –
 Optical fiber –
 Optimal control –
 Oscillation –
 Oscilloscope –
 Oudin coil –
 Out of phase –
 Outline of electrical engineering –
 Overhead line –
 Oversampling –
 Overshoot (signal) –
 Overvoltage –
 Oxidation –
 Oxygen –
 Oxygen-free copper –

P 
 Pad-mounted transformer – 
 Pantograph (rail) –
 Paraformer – 
 Parameter estimation –
 Park transform –
 Park's transformation –
 Partial discharge –
 Passivity (engineering) –
 Patch cables –
 Peak demand –
 Pearl Street Station –
 Peltier–Seebeck effect –
 Pentagrid converter –
 Pentode –
 Permanent magnet synchronous generator –
 Permanent magnet –
 Permeability (electromagnetism) –
 Personal computer –
 Personal digital assistant –
 Perturbation theory –
 Petroleum –
 pH meter – 
 Phase (waves) –
 Phase converter – 
 Phase-fired controllers –
 Phase-locked loop –
 Phase modulation –
 Phasor –
 Phasor measurement unit –
 Phasor –
 Phonograph –
 Photocell –
 Photodetector –
 Photodiode –
 Photometer –
 Photonics –
 Photoresistor –
 Phototransistor –
 Physics –
 Physis –
 PID controller –
 Piezoelectric effect –
 Piezoelectric motor –
 Pigovian tax –
 PIN diode –
 Pirelli –
 Planar graph –
 Plasma (physics) –
 Plenum cable –
 Plug-in hybrid –
 P-N junction –
 Polarization density –
 Polyethylene –
 Polymer –
 Polyphase coil – 
 Polyphase system –
 Polypropylene –
 Polytetrafluoroethylene –
 Pontryagin's minimum principle –
 Port (circuit theory) –
 Positive feedback –
 Potential difference –
 Potentiometer –
 Potentiometers –
 Power –
 Power BJT –
 Power cable –
 Power conditioner – 
 Power consumption –
 Power converter – 
 Power distribution –
 Power electronics –
 Power engineering –
 Power-factor correction  –
 Power factor –
 Power-flow study –
 Power generation –
 Power grid –
 Power inverter –
 Power inverter – 
 Power-line carrier communication –
 Power-line communication –
 Power MOSFET –
 Power plant –
 Power rating –
 Power quality –
 Power station –
 Power storage –
 Power supplies –
 Power-system automation –
 Power-system protection –
 Precious metal –
 Pressure –
 Printed circuit board –
 Printer (computing) –
 Process control –
 Product lifecycle management –
 Product safety –
 Professional communication –
 Professional engineer –
 Programmable logic controller –
 Programming language –
 Project management –
 Projection (mathematics) –
 Prolec GE –
 Protective relay –
 Proximity effect (electromagnetism) –
 Pulse transformer –
 Pulse-width modulation –
 Pulse-amplitude modulation (PAM) –
 Pulse-code modulation –
 Pumped-storage hydroelectricity –
 Push switch –
 Push–pull converter –

Q
 Quadrature booster –
 Qualitative data –
 Quality –
 Quality control –
 Quality factor –
 Quantity –
 Quantization (signal processing) –

R
 Radar cross-section –
 Radar –
 Radio frequency –
 Radio transmitter –
 Radio –
 Railroad –
 Railway electrification system –
 Rankine cycle –
 Rapid transit –
 Reactive power –
 Real-time operating system –
 Receiver (radio) –
 Rechargeable battery –
 Reciprocity (electromagnetism) –
 Record player –
 Rectifier –
 Rectiformer –
 Recursive least squares –
 Reed switch –
 Regenerative braking –
 Regenerative circuit –
 Reis telephone –
 Relaxation oscillator –
 Relay –
 Reliability engineering –
 Reluctance motor –
 Remanence –
 Remote racking system –
 Remote Sensing –
 Renewable electricity –
 Renewable Energy Certificates –
 Renewable energy payments –
 Renewable energy policy –
 Repeating coil –
 Repowering –
 Repulsion motor –
 Resettable fuse –
 Residual-current circuit breaker –
 Resistive circuit –
 Resistivity –
 Resistor –
 Resistors –
 Resolver (electrical) – 
 Resonant cavity –
 Resonant inductive coupling –
 Reverse engineering –
 RF connector –
 RF engineering –
 RG-6 –
 Rheoscope –
 Rheostat –
 Right hand grip rule –
 Ripple (electrical) –
 RLC circuit –
 Robotics –
 Robust control –
 Rogowski coil –
 Root locus –
 Root mean square –
 Rotary converter –
 Rotary encoder –
 Rotary switch –
 Rotary transformer – 
 Rotary variable differential transformer –
 Rotation (mathematics) –
 Rotor (electric) –
 Routh–Hurwitz stability criterion –
 Routh–Hurwitz theorem –

S
 Sallen–Key filter –
 Sample and hold –
 Sampling (information theory) –
 Sampling frequency –
 Satellite radio –
 Satellite –
 Saturation (magnetic) –
 SCADA –
 Schmitt trigger –
 Schottky diode –
 Scott-T transformer –
 s-domain –
 SDTV –
 Segmentation (image processing) –
 Selenium rectifiers –
 Semiconductor device –
 Semiconductor fabrication –
 Semiconductor –
 Sensor –
 Serial communication –
 Series and parallel circuits –
 SETI –
 Shaded-pole motor –
 Shaft voltage –
 Shielded twisted pair –
 Short-circuit test – 
 Short circuit –
 Shunt (electrical) –
 SI –
 Siemens & Halske –
 Siemens (unit) –
 Siemens –
 Signal (electrical engineering) –
 Signal (information theory) –
 Signal noise –
 Signal processing –
 Signal strength –
 Signal-flow graph –
 Signal-to-noise ratio –
 Silicon controlled rectifier –
 Silicon Valley –
 Silicon – 
 Silver –
 Sine wave –
 Single-phase electric power –
 Single-phase –
 Single-sideband modulation –
 Skin effect –
 Sliding mode control –
 Slip ring –
 Small signal model –
 Smart grid –
 Smith chart –
 Snowy Mountains scheme –
 Software engineering –
 Software –
 Solar cell –
 Solar energy –
 Solar micro-inverter –
 Solar power plants in the Mojave Desert – 
 Solar power –
 Soldering –
 Solenoid –
 Solid state (electronics) –
 Solid state physics –
 Solid-state circuit –
 Sound recording –
 Space flight –
 Space vector modulation –
 Spark spread –
 Spark-gap transmitter –
 Spectrum analyzer –
 Speech processing –
 SPICE –
 Split phase –
 Square wave –
 Stability theory –
 Stable polynomial –
 Stacking factor – 
 Star-mesh transform –
 State observer –
 State-space representation –
 Static VAR compensator –
 Stator –
 Steady-state –
 Steam turbine –
 Steel –
 Step response –
 Stepper motor –
 Stereophonic sound –
 Stokes' theorem –
 Storage tube –
 Stray capacitance – 
 Structure gauge –
 Structured cabling –
 Submarine communications cable –
 Sulfur hexafluoride circuit breaker –
 Sulfur hexafluoride –
 Sun Microsystems –
 Super grid –
 Supercomputer –
 Superconducting electric machine –
 Superconductivity –
 Superfluid –
 Superheterodyne receiver –
 Superposition theorem –
 Surge arrester –
 Surge protection –
 Switch –
 Switched reluctance motor – 
 Switched-mode power supply –
 Switchgear –
 Symbolic circuit analysis –
 Symmetrical components –
 Synchro –
 Synchronization (alternating current) –
 Synchronous circuit –
 Synchronous motor –
 Synchronous rectification – 
 Synchroscope –
 Syncom –
 System identification –
 System on a chip –
 System on module –
 Systems analysis –

T
 Tachometer –
 Tap (transformer) – 
 Tap changer – 
 Taylor series –
 Technical drawing –
 Technology –
 Telecommunication –
 Telecommunications cable –
 Telecommunications engineering –
 Telecommunications Industry Association –
 Telecommunications –
 Telegraph –
 Telephone balance unit –
 Telephone line –
 Telephone –
 Television –
 Tellegen's theorem –
 Temperature –
 Tensile strength –
 Tensile stress –
 Tesla (unit) –
 Tesla coil –
 Tetrode –
 Thermal conductivity –
 Thermal expansion –
 Thermionic emission –
 Thermistor –
 Thermocouple –
 Thermodynamic efficiency –
 Thermodynamics –
 Thermoelectric effect –
 Thermostat –
 Thévenin theorem –
 Third rail –
 Three-phase AC railway electrification –
 Three-phase electric power –
 Three-phase power –
 Three-phase –
 Thyristor drive –
 Thyristor –
 Tidal power –
 Time sharing –
 Time-invariant system –
 Timeline of electrical and electronic engineering –
 Tin –
 Topology (electrical circuits) –
 Toroidal inductors and transformers – 
 Torque –
 Total harmonic distortion (THD)  –
 Traction battery –
 Traction current –
 Traction motor –
 Traction substation –
 Transatlantic communications cable –
 Transatlantic telegraph cable –
 Transceiver –
 Transducers –
 Transfer function –
 Transformer oil testing – 
 Transformer oil –
 Transformer types – 
 Transformer – 
 Transformerboard –
 Transient response –
 Transils –
 Transistor –
 Transistors –
 Transmission (telecommunications) –
 Transmission line –
 Transmission system operator –
 Transmission tower –
 Transmitter –
 Traveling-wave tube –
 Trembler coil – 
 TRIAC –
 Triangle wave –
 Trigger transformer –
 Triode –
 Trolley pole –
 Trolleybus –
 TRW Inc. –
 Tuned circuit –
 Twisted pair –
 Two-phase electric power –
 Two-port network –
 Two-sided Laplace transform –
 Tyco Electronics –
 Types of capacitor –

U
 Ubiquitous computing –
 Ultrasonic motor –
 Ultrasonics –
 Undersampling –
 Underwriters Laboratories –
 Unijunction transistor –
 Unipolar motor –
 University College London – 
 University of Missouri –
 Unix –
 Unshielded twisted pair –
 Upsampling –
 Utility frequency –
 Utility pole –

V
 Vacuum capacitor –
 Vacuum tube –
 Variable capacitor –
 Variable-frequency drive –
 Variac –
 Varicap –
 Variety (cybernetics) –
 Varistor –
 Varnish –
 Vector (geometric) –
 Vector calculus –
 Vector control (motor) –
 Vector group –
 Vehicle-to-grid –
 Vehicular automation –
 Velcro –
 Versorium –
 Vibrator (electronic) –
 Video camera tube –
 Video game console –
 Video processing –
 Virtual instrumentation –
 Virtual power plant –
 VLSI –
 Volt –
 Voltage compensation –
 Voltage-controlled amplifier –
 Voltage controller –
 Voltage converter –
 Voltage division –
 Voltage doubler –
 Voltage regulation –
 Voltage regulator –
 Voltage source –
 Voltage spike –
 Voltage –
 Voltage-to-current converter –
 Volt-ampere –
 Voltmeter –
 Volumetric flow rate –

W
 War of the currents –
 Ward Leonard control –
 Watt –
 Wattmeter –
 Waveguide (electromagnetism) –
 Waveguide –
 Weber –
 Welding –
 Wet transformer –
 Whitaker Foundation –
 Whole-life cost –
 Wiener filter –
 Wiener process –
 Williams tube –
 Wind farm –
 Wind power in South Australia –
 Wind power –
 Wind speed –
 Wind turbine –
 Wire –
 Wireless network –
 Wireless telegraphy –

X
 X-ray –

Y
 Yagi antenna –
 Yahoo –
 Y-delta transform –

Z
 Z3 (computer) –
 z80 –
 Zener diode –
 Zigzag transformer –
 Zilog –
 Z-transform –

Biographies

A
 Abramson, Norman –
 Adams, Comfort A. –
 Alexanderson, Ernst
 Airy, George Biddell –
 Ampère, André-Marie –
 Yakubovich, Vladimir –
 Armstrong, Edwin –
 Ayrton, William Edward –
 Ashby, William Ross –

B
 Bardeen, John –
 Baudot, Emile –
 Bechtolsheim, Andy –
 Beckman, Arnold Orville –
 Bell, Alexander Graham –
 Bellman, Richard –
 Bennett, Alfred Rosling –
 Bláthy, Ottó –
 Blondel, André –
 Blumlein, Alan –
 Bode, Hendrik Wade –
 Bogoliubov, Nikolay –
 Boucherot, Paul –
 Brattain, Walter –
 Braun, Karl Ferdinand –
 Brandenburg, Karlheinz –
 Brown, Charles Eugene Lancelot –
 Brown, William C. –
 Bright, Charles Tilston –
 Bruch, Walter –
 Brush, Charles F. –
 Burgess, Charles Frederick –

C
 Camras, Marvin –
 Campbell-Swinton, Alan Archibald –
 Carson, John Renshaw –
 Clapp, James Kilton –
 Clarke, Edith –
 Coolidge, William –
 Concordia, Charles –
 Conway, Lynn –
 Corin, William –
 Crompton, R. E. B. –
 Cray, Seymour –

D
 Darlington, Sidney –
 Darrieus, George –
 Davenport, Thomas –
 De Forest, Lee –
 de Mestral, Georges –
 Dennard, Robert H. –
 Dennis, Jack –
 Deprez, Marcel –
 Déri, Miksa –
 Dibner, Bern –
 Doherty, Robert –
 Dolivo-Dobrovolsky, Mikhail –
 Dolby, Ray –
 Duddell, William –
 DuMont, Allen B. –

E
 Eckert, John Presper –
 Edison, Thomas –
 Engelbart, Douglas –
 Entz, Justus B. –
 Erlang, Agner Krarup –
 Espenschied, Lloyd –
 Evans, Walter R. –
 Euler, Leonhard –

F
 Faggin, Federico –
 Faraday, Michael –
 Farmer, Moses G. –
 Farnsworth, Philo T. –
 Ferranti, Sebastian Ziani de –
 Ferraris, Galileo –
 Fessenden, Reginald –
 Fink, Donald G. –
 Fischer, Gerhard –
 Fleming, John Ambrose –
 Flowers, Thomas –
 Fontaine, Hippolyte –
 Forbes, George –
 Forrester, Jay –
 Fortescue, Charles Legeyt –
 Fourier, Jean Baptiste Joseph –
 Fuller, Leonard F. –

G
 Gabor, Dennis –
 Gaulard, Lucien –
 Gauss, Carl Friedrich –
 Gilbert, William –
 Giorgi, Giovanni – 
 Gramme, Zénobe –
 Gray, Elisha –
 Grimsdale, Richard –
 Guillemin, Ernst A. –

H
 Hadfield, Robert –
 Hammer, Edward E. –
 Hartley, Ralph –
 Halske, Johann Georg –
 Heaviside, Oliver –
 Hefner-Alteneck, Friedrich von –  
 Heil, Oskar –
 Héroult, Paul –
 Hertz, Heinrich –
 Hewitt, Peter Cooper –
 Hewlett, William Reddington –
 Hoff, Marcian –
 Hopkinson, Edward – 
 Hopkinson, John –
 Hopper, Grace –
 Horowitz, Paul –
 Houston, Edwin J. –
 Hirst, Hugo –
 Hull, Albert –
 Hyland, Lawrence A. –

I
 Insull, Samuel –

J
 Jenkin, Fleeming –
 Joy, Bill –

K
 Kálmán, Rudolf –
 Kando, Kálmán –
 Keith, Nathaniel S. –
 Kennelly, Arthur E. –
 Kettering, Charles –
 Kilby, Jack –
 Knoll, Max –
 Kolmogorov, Andrey –
 Kraus, John D. –
 Kroemer, Herbert--
 Krylov, Nikolay Mitrofanovich –

L
 Laithwaite, Eric –
 Lamarr, Hedy –
 Lamm, Uno –
 Lamme, Benjamin G. –
 Leclanché, Georges –
 Leeds, Morris E. –
 Leonard, Harry Ward –
 Lodygin, Alexander –
Lyapunov, Alexander –

M
 Mäkitalo, Östen –
 Marconi, Guglielmo –
 Marsh, Orlando R. –
 Marx, Erwin Otto –
 Mauchly, John –
 Maxwell, James Clerk –
 Merrill, William Henry –
 Minorsky, Nicolas –
 Merz, Charles Hesterman –
 Metcalfe, Robert –
 Moll, John L. –
 Moog, Robert –
 Moore, Daniel McFarlan –

N
 Nakamura, Shuji –
 Nichols, Nathaniel B. –
 Norton, Edward Lawry –
 Noyce, Robert –
 Nyquist, Harry –

O
 Ohm, Georg –
 Oliver, Bernard M. –
 Olsen, Kenneth –
 Ovshinsky, Stanford R. –

P
 Packard, David –
 Park, Robert H. –
 Parsons, Charles Algernon –
 Pederson, Donald –
 Pierce, G. W. –
 Pontryagin, Lev Semenovich –
 Pope, Franklin Leonard –
 Popov, Vasile M. –
 Poulsen, Valdemar –
 Preece, William Henry –
 Pupin, Michael I. –

R
 Ragazzini, John R. –
 Ramo, Simon –
 Ranger, Richard H. –
 Reeves, Alec –
 Reis, Johann Philipp –
 Rickover, Hyman G. –
 Rogers, Edward S. Sr. –
 Rosen, Harold –
 Round, H. J. –
 Routh, Edward John –
 Rudenberg, Reinhold –

S
 Schwendler, Carl Louis –
 Seebeck, Thomas Johann –
 Shannon, Claude E. –
 Shallenberger, Oliver B. –
 Shockley, William B. –
 Siedel, Philipp Ludwig –
 Schouhamer Immink, Kees A. –
 Siemens, Alexander –
 Siemens, Carl Wilhelm –
 Siemens, Ernst Werner von –
 Smith, Phillip Hagar –
 Spencer, Percy –
 Sprague, Frank J. –
 Stanley, William, Jr. –
 Starr, Chauncey –
 Steinmetz, Charles Proteus –

T
 Tarzian, Sarkes –
 Taylor, Albert H. –
 Tellegen, Bernard D. H. –
 Tesla, Nikola –
 Thomson, Elihu –
 Thompson, Silvanus P. –
 Thomson, William –
 Thury, René –
 Tihanyi, Kálmán –
 Tukey, John –

V
 Van Depoele, Charles Joseph –
 Varley, C. F. –
 Vidmar, Milan –
 Viterbi, Andrew –
 Volta, Alessandro –
 von Lieben, Robert –
 von Miller, Oskar –

W
 Wadley, Trevor –
 Watson-Watt, Robert –
 Watt, James –
 Westinghouse, George –
 Wheatstone, Charles –
 Wheeler, Harold Alden –
 Whitaker, Uncas A. –
 Widlar, Bob –
 Wiener, Norbert –
 Wirth, Niklaus –
 Wozniak, Steve –

Y
 Yablochkov, Pavel –
 Yagi, Hidetsugu –
 Yang, Jerry –

Z
 Zames, George –
 Zobel, Otto Julius –
 Zuse, Konrad –

Electrical-engineering-related lists
Electrical engineering topics (alphabetical)
Electrical engineering topics (alphabetical)